Holaku Rambod (1919–2007) was an Iranian politician and a member of the Iranian Parliament from the 19th to 24th term.

Background 
Rambod was born in 1919 in Tehran. He attended Nezam Elementary School from the sixth grade and graduated from the Officers' College in the artillery branch with the rank of second lieutenant.

After completing the staff college course, Rambod became commander of his artillery regiment from 1939 to 1942. He left the army in 1952 and went to America, where he took business management courses.

Business and financial activities 
Between 1951 and 1957, Rambod was the manager of the Press Express and Etan Express joint ventures, and after the establishment of the Civil Aviation Association, he became the union's secretary general. He was in charge of the Alitalia company in Tehran for seven years.

Political activity 
Before the 1953 coup, he was a member of the National Front but later became interested in the Pahlavi regime. The beginning of his political career was participating in the elections of the 17th and 18th terms of the National Assembly, in which he did not succeed. Still, he was present as a representative of his people in the 19th term of the National Assembly until the 24th term.

Rambod was not only the main spokesperson of the party in the parliament but he was considered one of the most active and ambitious leaders of the party in the party circles. He believed the People's Party faced internal and external problems. He used to say: "The New Iran Party uses government agencies to put pressure on the People's Party and its personnel, and the People's Party has no means to fight back and even protect its personnel, so there is little hope for progress within the party." Additionally, there was a deep division within the People's Party, which prevented its members from focusing their energy on key issues. Rambod tried to establish the spirit of unity in the party. In 1960, the People's Party was led by Asadullah Alam, and Rambod was one of Alam's friends and the leader of the People's Party in the National Assembly. In his constituency, he was in tight competition with the leader of the Novin Iran Party, Suleiman Pasha Khan Babakan Sasani.

Attending the government minister 
In 1977, he resigned as the people's representative in Jamshid Amouzegar's cabinet and was appointed Advisory Minister to Parliament. In this position, Rambod behaved insultingly with the opposition representatives of the government.

After the Islamic Revolution in Iran 
Rambod was sentenced to death by the Islamic Revolutionary Court after the 1979 Iranian revolution and his property was confiscated. Habib Lajordi interviewed him in Nice, France in 1983 as part of Iran's oral history project.

References

1919 births
2007 deaths
Iranian politicians
20th-century Iranian politicians